Ellington Township is one of twenty-two townships in Adams County, Illinois, United States.  As of the 2020 census, its population was 2,820 and it contained 1,140 housing units. The southwest corner of the township is now part of Quincy Township.

Geography

Unincorporated towns
 Bloomfield
 Cliola
 Country Meadows
 Ewbanks
 Hickory Grove
(This list is based on USGS data and may include former settlements.)

Cemeteries
The township contains five cemeteries: Ellington Church, Kemp, Laughlin, Powell and Voorhees.

Major highways
  US Route 24
  Illinois State Route 96
  Illinois State Route 336

Airports and landing strips
 Ellington Field
 Mast Field

Demographics
As of the 2020 census there were 2,820 people, 997 households, and 866 families residing in the township. The racial makeup of the township was 94.22% White, 1.10% African American, 0.14% Native American, 0.64% Asian, 0.00% Pacific Islander, 0.85% from other races, and 3.05% from two or more races. Hispanic or Latino of any race were 1.70% of the population.

There were 997 households, out of which 34.20% had children under the age of 18 living with them, 75.43% were married couples living together, 7.62% had a female householder with no spouse present, and 13.14% were non-families. 13.10% of all households were made up of individuals, and 8.20% had someone living alone who was 65 years of age or older. The average household size was 2.76 and the average family size was 2.98.

The township's age distribution consisted of 25.3% under the age of 18, 1.4% from 18 to 24, 23.3% from 25 to 44, 28.7% from 45 to 64, and 21.4% who were 65 years of age or older. The median age was 45.0 years. For every 100 females, there were 94.8 males. For every 100 females age 18 and over, there were 93.9 males.

The median income for a household in the township was $80,393, and the median income for a family was $88,452. Males had a median income of $50,849 versus $38,902 for females. The per capita income for the township was $36,961. About 0.0% of families and 2.1% of the population were below the poverty line, including 0.0% of those under age 18 and 1.7% of those age 65 or over.

School districts
 Community Unit School District 4
 Quincy School District 172

Political districts
 Illinois' 17th congressional district
 State House District 93
 State Senate District 47

External links
 
 United States Census Bureau 2007 TIGER/Line Shapefiles
 United States National Atlas
 List of Adams County township trustees
 City-Data.com
 Illinois State Archives

References

Townships in Adams County, Illinois
Populated places established in 1849
Townships in Illinois
1849 establishments in Illinois